Justice Thayer may refer to:

Andrew J. Thayer, associate justice of the Oregon Supreme Court
John M. Thayer (judge), associate justice of the Connecticut Supreme Court
W. Stephen Thayer III, associate justice of the New Hampshire Supreme Court
W. W. Thayer, chief justice of the Oregon Supreme Court

See also
Judge Thayer (disambiguation)